Whittlesea railway station is on the Ely–Peterborough line in the East of England and serves the town of Whittlesey, Cambridgeshire. Whittlesea is an older and alternative spelling of the town's name.

All of the original station buildings have long since been demolished and only the two staggered platforms remain. Unlike most level crossings, the gates at Whittlesea station are still opened and closed manually by a member of railway staff, who is based in the adjacent crossing keeper's hut.

On 14 September 1968, Flying Scotsman stopped at the station twice to have its tenders refilled with water. The locomotive was chartering The Chesterfield Flyer from Ipswich to Chesterfield, via Norwich.

Services
Greater Anglia provides the primary service at Whittlesea. There is one train every two hours each way, including Sundays, between Peterborough and Ipswich; there are occasional extensions to Colchester.

East Midlands Railway runs a single morning service to Liverpool Lime Street Monday-Saturday only.

References

External links

Railway stations in Cambridgeshire
DfT Category F2 stations
Former Great Eastern Railway stations
Railway stations served by East Midlands Railway
Railway stations served by CrossCountry
Greater Anglia franchise railway stations
Whittlesey